The 1948 Tinker Air Force Base tornadoes were two tornadoes which struck Tinker Air Force Base in Oklahoma City, Oklahoma, on March 20 and 25, 1948. Both are estimated to have been equivalent to F3 in intensity on the modern Fujita scale of tornado intensity, which was not devised until 1971. The March 20 tornado was the costliest tornado in Oklahoma history at the time. On March 25, meteorologists at the base noticed the extreme similarity between the weather conditions of that day and March 20, and later in the day issued a "tornado forecast", which was verified when a tornado struck the base that evening. This was the first official tornado forecast, as well as the first successful tornado forecast, in recorded history.

March 20 tornado

Weather forecasting was still crude and prone to large errors in the era before weather satellites and computer modeling. Thunderstorms were not even in the forecast for the evening of March 20.

At 10:00, the tornado reached the southwest corner of the base. Illuminated by nearly constant lightning, the tornado was highly visible as it bisected the base, tossing around planes which were parked in the open. The control tower reported a  wind gust before the windows shattered, injuring several personnel with flying glass. The tornado dissipated at the northeast corner of the base.

The tornado missed most structures on the base, but the damage to expensive military aircraft was substantial. The total damage cost came to around $10 million, or $ million in  United States dollars. This was the most damaging tornado in Oklahoma up to that date.

Investigation and tornado forecast
In the aftermath of the first tornado, an official inquiry was conducted into the failure to predict the destructive tornado. Air Force investigators came to the conclusion that "due to the nature of the storm it was not forecastable given the present state of the art." They also made recommendations that the meteorological community determine a tornado warning system for the public, as well as a protocol for protecting life and property at military bases.

Both of these investigations began almost immediately. In the days following the tornado, Tinker's meteorologists Major Ernest J. Fawbush and Captain Robert C. Miller investigated surface and upper-air weather data from this and past tornado outbreaks, hoping to be able to identify conditions which were favorable for tornadoes. By March 24, they had compiled several possible tornado indicators, and decided it would be difficult, but possible, to identify large tornado threat areas in the future.

On the morning of March 25, base meteorologists noticed that weather charts for the day were strikingly similar to those before the March 20 tornado. Forecasts issued by the Weather Bureau indicated that almost the same conditions would be present in the evening of March 25 as were present on March 20. In the morning, they issued a forecast for "heavy thunderstorms" effective for 5–6 pm that evening. This would allow the base's commander to alert base personnel that they may institute their brand-new tornado precautions.

As the day wore on, conditions appeared more and more favorable for thunderstorms, and more and more similar to the events of March 20. Weather radar images showed a severe squall line had formed to the west, and weather stations to the west reported cumulonimbus clouds and thunderstorms. In an afternoon meeting, under some pressure from their commanding officer, base meteorologists composed and issued the first official tornado forecast. Although they were aware of the small chance of success, they felt they had no choice, since the conditions were so similar to March 20. Equipment, which could be, was moved to bomb-proof shelters, and base personnel were moved to safer areas.

March 25 tornado

Although storms were relatively benign up to the point where they reached Tinker, a supercell formed just west of the base, and at around 6 pm a tornado touched down on the base for the second time in six days. This second tornado caused $6 million in damage, or $ million in  dollars. However, due to precautions enacted because of the tornado forecast, no injuries were reported, and damage totals could have been much higher.

Legacy
The tornado prediction proved to be successful, even if its precision was mostly due to chance. Before this point, the Weather Bureau had a policy against issuing tornado warnings, mainly due to fear of panic by the public, and subsequent complacency if forecasts turned out to be false alarms.

Due to lives and costs saved, Fawbush and Miller continued their tornado forecasts, which verified at quite a high rate over the next three years. At first, they kept their forecasts secret. In the spring and summer of 1949, they issued eighteen forecasts for tornadoes within a  area, and all eighteen proved successful. In the subsequent years, while not explicitly using the word "tornado", the Weather Bureau used the pair's forecasts to predict "severe local storms".

The synoptic pattern which occurred on March 25 later became known as the "Miller type-B" pattern and is recognized as one of the most potent severe weather setups.

See also

Weather forecasting
1999 Bridge Creek–Moore tornado, another tornado that affected the airbase

References

Bibliography

Tinker Air Force Base tornadoes
Tornadoes in Oklahoma
Tinker Air Force Base Tornadoes, 1948
Tinker Air Force Base tornadoes